Danak (also Romanized as Dānak; also known as Yal Karpī) is a village in Kharaqan-e Sharqi Rural District, Abgarm District, Avaj County, Qazvin Province, Iran. At the 2006 census, its population was 374, in 92 families.

References 

Populated places in Avaj County